The Embassy of Peru in France is the foremost diplomatic mission of Peru in France.

The current Peruvian ambassador to France is Rolando Javier Ruiz Rosas Cateriano, also accredited to Monaco since July 11, 2022.

History
Both countries established relations in 1826 and have maintained them since. Relations were severed once during World War II with the French State of Philippe Pétain, with Peru instead establishing relations with Free France and normalizing its relations with said government after the war.

The embassy is housed in a mansion belonging to the Peruvian government since 1958. It was built in 1880 by Julien Bayard and remodeled in 1912 by Émile Hochereau. It was partially listed as a historical monument by order of December 21, 2004.

See also
Embassy of France, Lima

References

Peru
Paris
France–Peru relations